A picul 
or tam is a traditional Asian unit of weight, defined as "as much as a man can carry on a shoulder-pole".

History
The word picul appeared as early as the mid 9th century in Javanese. 

Following Spanish, Portuguese, British and most especially the Dutch colonial maritime trade, the term picul was both a convenient unit, and a lingua franca unit that was widely understood and employed by other Austronesians (in modern Malaysia and the Philippines) and their centuries-old trading relations with Indians, Chinese and Arabs. It remained a convenient reference unit for many commercial trade journals in the 19th century. One example is Hunts Merchant Magazine of 1859 giving detailed tables of expected prices of various commodities, such as coffee, e.g. one picul of Javanese coffee could be expected to be bought from 8 to 8.50 Spanish dollars in Batavia and Singapore.

Definitions

As for any traditional measurement unit, the exact definition of the picul varied historically and regionally.
In imperial China and later, the unit was used for a measure equivalent to 100 catties.

In 1831, the Dutch East Indies authorities acknowledged local variances in the definition of the pikul.
In Hong Kong, one picul was defined in Ordinance No. 22 of 1844 as  avoirdupois pounds. The modern definition is exactly 60.478982 kilograms.
The measure was and remains used on occasion in Taiwan where it is defined as 60 kg.<ref>Weights and Measures in Use in Taiwan  from the Republic of China Yearbook--Taiwan 2001.</ref> The last, a measure of rice, was 20 picul, or 1,200 kg.

The stone
While the character "石" ("stone") is normally pronounced shí (Cantonese: sek6), as a unit of measure it is pronounced dàn (Cantonese: daam3).

Historically, during the Qin and Han dynasties, the stone was used as a unit of measurement equal to 120 catties. Government officials at the time were paid in grain, counted in stones. The amount of salary in weight was then used as a ranking system for officials, with the top ministers being paid 2000 stones.

It was made obsolete by subsequent overriding legislation in 1885, which included the picul but not the stone, to avoid confusion with European-origin measures that are similarly called stone.

References

Chinese units in Hong Kong
Units of mass
Human-based units of measurement